Jay Nolly (born January 2, 1982) is an American former soccer player who played as a goalkeeper.

College 

Nolly played college soccer at Indiana University, where he backstopped the Hoosiers to the College Cup in 2003 and 2004 and was named All-Big Ten in his last three seasons.

Professional career 
Real Salt Lake drafted Nolly in the second round of the 2005 MLS SuperDraft and he saw limited action with the team in his rookie season.

After the 2006 season, he was dealt to D.C. United in a deal that involved Freddy Adu and Nick Rimando. He had trials at Celtic FC of Scotland and Dinamo Bucharest of Romania, but eventually signed with United in February 2007. He was later waived by D.C. United in January 2008 to make room for incoming transfers from South America.

He signed with the Vancouver Whitecaps on January 23, 2008. On October 12, 2008, he helped the Whitecaps capture their second USL First Division Championship beating the Puerto Rico Islanders 2–1 in Vancouver
On December 16, 2008, the Vancouver Whitecaps announced the re-signing of Nolly for the 2009 season.

On December 5, 2011, Chicago Fire announced they acquired Nolly in exchange for their first round selection in the 2013 MLS Supplemental Draft.

After the conclusion of the 2012 season, Chicago declined the 2013 option on Nolly's contract and he entered the 2012 MLS Re-Entry Draft. Nolly went undrafted and became a free agent.

Honors

Vancouver Whitecaps 
 USL First Division Championship: 2008

Indiana University 
 NCAA Men's Division I Soccer Championship: 2003 2004

Individual 
 USSF D-2 Pro League Goalkeeper of the Year: 2010
 USSF D-2 Pro League Best XI: 2010

References

External links 
 Chicago Fire biography
 

1982 births
Living people
American expatriate sportspeople in Canada
American expatriate soccer players
American soccer players
Chicago Fire FC players
D.C. United players
Expatriate soccer players in Canada
Association football goalkeepers
Indiana Hoosiers men's soccer players
Real Salt Lake players
Soccer players from Orlando, Florida
Major League Soccer players
USL First Division players
Vancouver Whitecaps (1986–2010) players
Vancouver Whitecaps FC players
USSF Division 2 Professional League players
Real Salt Lake draft picks
NCAA Division I Men's Soccer Tournament Most Outstanding Player winners